João Mouzinho de Albuquerque (21 February 1797 in Leiria – 8 August 1881 in Portalegre) was a Portuguese writer and administrator.

Biography
João Mouzinho de Albuquerque was born in Leiria on 21 February 1797, son of João Pedro Mouzinho de Albuquerque (1736–1802) and dona Luísa da Silva Gutiérrez de Ataíde (1763–18??), both from noble families. His father was a Fidalgo-knight of the Royal House and possessed two estates in Chelas. His mother was the daughter of Luís da Silva de Ataíde, a senior-guard of the Leiria pine forest and Lord of Casa do Terreiro.

He was Moço-Fidalgo of the Royal Household, Bachelor in Law from the University of Coimbra in 1820, Purveyor of the Casa da Moeda de Portugal, Administrator-General of the House of Braganza, etc.

He was the last holder of the Prazo of São Domingos, in Castelo de Vide, which he sold after 1834.

He married his niece Luísa Paula Mouzinho de Albuquerque (Cabanas Estate, São Brás da Romeira, Santarém, 4 January 1820 – at her old house at the Violeiros Street, Portalegre, 17 January 1907) and had an only son:
 Pedro Mouzinho de Albuquerque, who died young, unmarried and without issue

Published works
Reflexões Sobre a Agricultura Pública, Leiria, 1854
Juízo Crítico Sobre os Actos da Administração Finda com a Morte de S. M. a Senhora Dona Maria II, Lisboa, 1854
Memória Sobre a Moeda Portuguesa, etc, Elvas, 1862
O Deficit, nas Origens, etc, Lisboa, 1867

Notes

External links
 Genealogy of Pedro Mouzinho de Albuquerque

1797 births
1881 deaths
People from Leiria
19th-century Portuguese writers
19th-century male writers